Helichrysum luteoalbum, the Jersey cudweed, is a species of flowering plant in the family Asteraceae.

Description
Leaves are oblanceolate to lanceolate and covered in hairs like that of the edelweiss. The leaves can survive frozen over in winter. Flowers are cream, yellow, white, or pink. Seeds have a pappus which lets them float over long distances.

Taxonomy
This species was first published by Carl Linnaeus in his 1753 Species plantarum, under the name Gnaphalium luteo-album (the orthography was later changed to omit the hyphen). In 1829, Ludwig Reichenbach transferred it to Helichrysum, but this name was not taken up, and the species was retained in Gnaphalium until 1981, when Olive Mary Hilliard and Brian Laurence Burtt transferred it into Pseudognaphalium.

In 2004, an investigation into the phylogenetic relationships of Helichrysum and related genera found this species to have arisen within Helichrysum. As a result of this, Reichenbach's long-forgotten name for this species was resurrected. A later study showed that all the sampled Pseudognaphalium species arose within Helichrysum as did Anaphalis, Achyrocline and Humeocline.

Distribution and habitat
This species is so widely distributed that it is unclear where it is native and where naturalised. In general it is considered naturalised in North and South America, and native to every other continent except Antarctica. It grows in meadows, wastelands, and edges of forests. Its rosettes are occasionally mistaken for edelweiss.

Uses
In Vietnam, the plant is used as a food ingredient, such as in the rice cake banh khuc. It has also been used in traditional medicine of the region, as a diuretic, hemostatic, antipyretic, for the treatment of cough, and for pain relief.

See also
Nanakusa-no-sekku

References

luteoalbum
Flora of the Antipodes Islands